Patrik Kühnen and Tore Meinecke were the defending champions but they competed with different partners that year, Kühnen with Udo Riglewski and Meinecke with Ricki Osterthun.

Kühnen and Riglewski lost in the first round to Darren Cahill and Laurie Warder.

Meinecke and Osterthun lost in the quarterfinals to Jan Gunnarsson and Magnus Gustafsson.

Miloslav Mečíř and Milan Šrejber won in the final 7–6, 6–0 against Gunnarsson and Gustafsson.

Seeds
Champion seeds are indicated in bold text while text in italics indicates the round in which those seeds were eliminated.

 John Fitzgerald /  Anders Järryd (first round)
 Darren Cahill /  Laurie Warder (semifinals)
 Wally Masur /  Tom Nijssen (first round)
 Martin Davis /  Tobias Svantesson (first round)

Draw

External links
 1989 ABN World Tennis Tournament Doubles Draw

1989 Grand Prix (tennis)
1989 ABN World Tennis Tournament